José Ángel Pozo la Rosa (born 15 March 1996) is a Spanish professional footballer who plays as an attacking midfielder for Rayo Vallecano.

Club career

Early career
Born in Fuengirola, Málaga, Pozo started his football career at UD Fuengirola Los Boliches and was scouted by Real Madrid at the age of 11 to play for its youth set-up. He played for Real Madrid for five years before Manchester City paid £2.4 million to sign him in early 2012. The deal also brought over Pozo's younger brother Iker to play for Manchester City at academy level.

Manchester City
Playing for the English club's under-18s side, his first full season in England was impressive, netting him a nomination for Academy Player of the Year but his second season was cut short early by an ankle injury which limited him to just nine appearances for 2013–14. Nevertheless, he made a strong recovery and rejoined the Elite Development Side under Patrick Vieira, where he rapidly drew attention, earning himself the label of "Mini-Messi".

Pozo's first exposure to first team football came on 24 September 2014, when injuries to squad mates Sergio Agüero and Stevan Jovetić left him as the club's second most senior striker for the club's Football League Cup third round match at home against Sheffield Wednesday. Named as a substitute amidst a flurry of national press attention following comments by manager Manuel Pellegrini on the possibility of his appearing, Pozo was brought on in the 64th minute for Yaya Touré, with City already 4–0 up against ten men, making his first senior appearance for the club. He recorded his first senior goal in the 88th minute, the sixth of a 7–0 win.

Pozo made his Premier League debut on 3 December 2014 against Sunderland at the Stadium of Light, coming on as an 83rd-minute substitute for Samir Nasri in a 4–1 win. On 13 December, Pozo made his first start for Manchester City, in a 1–0 away win over Leicester City. He had been promoted from the substitutes' bench after Edin Džeko was injured during warm-up.

Almería
On 31 August 2015, Pozo moved to UD Almería of his native Andalusia on a five-year contract. On 6 September he made his debut for the club, coming on as a late substitute for Eldin Hadžić in a 2–1 home win against CA Osasuna; he also scored the winner in the 88th minute.

On 2 December 2015, Pozo scored the only goal for his team in a 3–1 home loss against Celta Vigo in the Copa del Rey.

Rayo Vallecano
On 27 July 2018, Pozo signed a five-year contract with La Liga side Rayo Vallecano. He made his debut for the club on 19 August, starting in a 4–1 home loss against Sevilla FC.

On 5 January 2022, Pozo renewed his contract with Rayo until 2024, and joined Al Ahli SC on loan for the remainder of 2021–22 Qatar Stars League season.

Career statistics

References

External links

1996 births
Living people
People from Fuengirola
Sportspeople from the Province of Málaga
Spanish footballers
Footballers from Andalusia
Association football forwards
Premier League players
La Liga players
Segunda División players
Qatar Stars League players
Manchester City F.C. players
UD Fuengirola Los Boliches players
UD Almería players
Rayo Vallecano players
Al Ahli SC (Doha) players
Spain youth international footballers
Spain under-21 international footballers
Spanish expatriate footballers
Spanish expatriate sportspeople in England
Expatriate footballers in England
Spanish expatriate sportspeople in Qatar
Expatriate footballers in Qatar